BCBS may refer to:

 The Basel Committee on Banking Supervision
 The Blue Cross Blue Shield Association
 Bishop Cotton Boys' School, in Bangalore, India
 Bounds Check Bypass Store, a Spectre-NG class security vulnerability